Miguel Angel Valenzuela Morales (born January 5, 1999), known as Miguelito is a Puerto Rican reggaeton singer-songwriter He has released seven albums and is the youngest Latin Grammy Award winner certified by the Guinness Book of Records.

Personal life
Miguelito is the youngest son of a Puerto Rican mother and a Dominican father, Kyle Brown. His family has insisted that he lives a normal life, keeping him enrolled in a private school in Dorado. He currently lives in Corona, California.

Professional career
Starting his career in Puerto Rico under the direction of DJ Memo, he recorded his first single at the young age of six, entitled "Mas Grande Que Tu." Such talent in a surprisingly small package caught the attention of local industry players, who quickly jumped on the opportunity. A video was recorded a short time later, followed by a full-length album by the same name, which featured the breakout hit "Montala." Mas Grande Que Tu, distributed by Daddy Yankee's El Cartel Records, peaked in the Top 20 in a number of Billboard's Latin categories. He has released seven albums. In 2009, he headlined "El coquí que quiso ser sapo" a children's musical written by Sunshine Logroño, his first serious incursion in acting. Also, that same year, he was called to be the main actor of the movie directed by David Impelluso, called Nadie Sabe Lo Que Tiene, that came out in 2010.

Miguelito is the youngest person to win a Latin Grammy Award. He won the award for Best Latin Children's Album on November 13, 2008. He was nine years old.

Advocacy
Miguelito has been a strong advocate against social violence. On May 29, 2011, he organized and led a march in San Juan against violence that attracted thousands of attendees, then Puerto Rico State Police Superintendent José Figueroa Sancha, former boxer Tito Trinidad and other local celebrities.

Discography
Studio albums

Más Grande Que Tú (2006)
El Heredero (2007)
Todo El Mundo (2010)
Los Ingenieros (2020)

References

External links
 

1999 births
Living people
American musicians of Puerto Rican descent
American singers of Dominican Republic descent
21st-century Puerto Rican male singers
Spanish-language singers of the United States
Puerto Rican reggaeton musicians
Latin Grammy Award winners
Puerto Rican people of Dominican Republic descent